Koani is a city located on the Tanzanian island of Unguja (Zanzibar). The city serves as capital of the Zanzibar Central/South region.

Regional capitals in Tanzania
Cities in Zanzibar
Unguja South Region